Curtis Stewart is an American violinist and composer.

Life and career
Stewart graduated from the Eastman School of Music and University of Rochester with a degree in Mathematics and Violin Performance, and Lehman college with a masters in music education. He has soloed at Carnegie Hall, Lincoln Center, Kennedy Center, and the 2022 GRAMMY Awards, among many others.

Stewart founded the string ensemble PUBLIQuartet in 2010, was finalist at the Concert Artists Guild Competition in 2013. He taught music at the Fiorello H. LaGuardia High School, and the Juilliard School. He received the Centennial Award from the Eastman School of Music in 2022. He is currently the artistic director of the American Composers Orchestra.

Selected discography
 Of Love (2023)
 Of Power (2021)
 Of Colors (2016)

Awards and nominations

References

External links
 

Living people

Year of birth missing (living people)
American violinists
21st-century violinists
American classical violinists
20th-century classical composers
American male classical composers
Eastman School of Music alumni